Gregory Glen Gard (born December 3, 1970) is an American college basketball coach for the Wisconsin Badgers. Gard took over on December 15, 2015, after Bo Ryan announced his retirement as head coach of the Badgers. Gard is a native of Cobb, Wisconsin. He attended Edgemont Junior – Senior High School and later mentored Alex and Matt Bernstein as their paths once again crossed at the University of Wisconsin.

Coaching career

Assistant coach
On December 15, 2015, Gard was announced as the interim head coach after Bo Ryan announced his retirement following the Badgers win over Texas A&M Corpus Christi. Gard had been Ryan's longest-serving assistant, having coached together for 23 years at the time of the transition. They had coached together at three schools—Gard's alma mater of Wisconsin–Platteville, where he had played on the varsity baseball team as a freshman; Milwaukee; and Wisconsin. In the process, Gard became one of the most respected assistant coaches in the college game.

Head coach

2015–16 season
After Gard took over in the  2015–2016 season, the team stumbled, winning just two of their next seven games, with an overall record of 9–9 at that point. However the team's turnaround started with an upset over #4 Michigan State and won 11 of the next 13 games to finish out the regular season tied for third in the Big Ten with an overall record of 20–11 (12–6 in the Big Ten). Following the end of the regular season, on March 7, 2016, Wisconsin removed the interim tag and Gard was promoted to head coach of the Badgers. Wisconsin received an at-large bid to the NCAA tournament, where they beat #10 seeded Pittsburgh in the first round. Wisconsin defeated #2 seeded Xavier by a 3-point buzzer beater from Bronson Koenig in the second round to advance to the Sweet 16. However they lost to #6 seeded Notre Dame in the Sweet 16. After the season ended Gard was named the 2016 Jim Phelan National Coach of the Year.

2020–21 season

Leaked recording 
On June 22, 2021, a surreptitious recording of a meeting, in which several members of the 2020–21 team directed criticism at Gard, was leaked to the Wisconsin State Journal and subsequently posted to YouTube.

2021–22 season

2022 postgame fight
A fight took place involving Gard after the February 20, 2022 game between the Michigan Wolverines and the Wisconsin Badgers at the Kohl Center. During the game, Gard took two timeouts in the final minute as the Badgers held a significant lead over the Wolverines. Gard explained in an interview after the fight that the timeout was taken to reset the play as the ball had not yet crossed into Michigan's side of the court within 10 seconds, which would have led to a turnover. After the timeout, Wisconsin was able to advance the ball into Michigan's half of the court and the game ended soon afterward in a Badgers win with a score of 77-63.  

During the handshakes between the teams, Michigan Coach Juwan Howard appeared to initially ignore Coach Greg Gard and then attempted to walk past as Gard approached Howard and stopped him for the usual post-game handshake. Howard stated that he did not want to be touched and expressed his displeasure with the timeouts, grabbing Gard by the shirt at which point others began to separate them. Gard and Howard began yelling at one another, even as they were separated by their respective squads and security personnel, leading to a verbal escalation between the two coaches. As things continued to escalate, Howard reached in and struck Wisconsin assistant coach Joe Krabbenhoft with an open hand. This led to both teams to begin fighting each other. While most of the fight was pushes and shoves, at least three players threw punches; forward Moussa Diabaté for Michigan who was a starter for the game, forward Terrance Williams II for Michigan, and guard Jahcobi Neath for Wisconsin. The actions of both coaches and the players were condemned, which Howard receiving the majority for his physical contact against Krabbenhoft. The Big Ten Conference released a statement that they were reviewing the postgame events.  The following day, Gard was fined $10,000 for his actions for violating the Big Ten's sportsmanship policy while Howard was suspended for the remainder of Michigan's season and fined $40,000.

Head coaching record

References

External links
 Wisconsin profile

1970 births
Living people
American men's basketball coaches
American men's basketball players
Basketball coaches from Wisconsin
Basketball players from Wisconsin
College men's basketball head coaches in the United States
High school basketball coaches in Wisconsin
Milwaukee Panthers men's basketball coaches
People from Iowa County, Wisconsin
Wisconsin Badgers men's basketball coaches
Wisconsin–Platteville Pioneers baseball players
Wisconsin–Platteville Pioneers men's basketball coaches